Protophyta castanea is a moth of the family Geometridae first described by Oswald Bertram Lower in 1898. It is found in New South Wales, Australia.

References

Moths described in 1898
Pseudoterpnini